Galicano Apacible Antonio y del Castillo (June 25, 1864 – March 22, 1949) was a Filipino physician and politician from Batangas. A cousin to José Rizal, he co-founded La Solidaridad and the Nacionalista Party.

He held the office of governor of Batangas from 1907 to 1909 and was the representative of the First District of Batangas to the Philippine Assembly from 1909 to 1916. He was then named Secretary of Agriculture and Natural Resources in 1917, serving until 1921. He is known for his piece To the American People, an Appeal, in which he tried to plead with the people of the United States to pressure its government not to invade his newly independent country.

References

Further reading 
 "The Philippine Revolution: La Solidaridad", Filipino.biz.ph (accessed July 10, 2007)
 "Filipino Patriots During the Propaganda Period" (accessed July 10, 2007)
  "History of Philippine Agriculture", Department of Agriculture (accessed July 10, 2007)
 Augusto de Viana "HK played key role in RP history" 
 "The Nacionalista Party: History" Nacionalista Party (accessed July 10, 2007)
 "Calicano C. Apacible" (accessed July 10, 2007)

People of the Philippine Revolution
1864 births
1949 deaths
Governors of Batangas
Members of the House of Representatives of the Philippines from Batangas
Secretaries of Agriculture of the Philippines
Secretaries of Environment and Natural Resources of the Philippines
People from Batangas
Nacionalista Party politicians
Members of the Philippine Legislature